Könchek (also spelled Konchak, Könchek, Končak, in Russian / Ukrainian: Кончак; died in 1187) was a Polovtsian khan of 12th century.

Biography 

Grandson of Sharukan and son of Otrok, he unified the Polovts tribes in the second half of the twelfth century.  Taking advantage of divisions among Russian princes, he made war against them in 1170 and 1180 by attacking the principalities of Kiev, Pereïaslavl, and Chernigov. His raids were particularly destructive along the Sula river.

In 1171, Könchek allied with the prince of Novhorod-Siverskyi Oleg II Svyatoslavich, in fight against the other Russian princes, but in 1184, during an attack led against the principality of Kiev, his troops was beaten near the Khorol river by the prince Sviatoslav III. The following year, Könchek defeated the prince Igor Svyatoslavich, who was taken prisoner near the Kaiala river (possibly modern Kalmius river). Igor's campaign against Könchek became the subject of an epic poem, The Tale of Igor's Campaign.

Könchek died in 1187. His daughter Svoboda ("Liberty" in Russian) married Vladimir III Igorevich, son of Igor, in 1188. In 1203, his son Yuri took Kiev as an ally of the prince Rurik Rostislavich who, chased from Kiev, recruited from the Polovts tribes to regain power.

References

Bibliography 
 Martin Dimnik, The Dynasty of Chernigov, 1146–1246, Cambridge University Press, 2003.
 Boris Grekov, Aleksandr Yakubovsky, The Golden Horde and Russia: Tatar rule in the XIII and XIV of the Yellow Sea to the Black Sea'. Translated from Russian by François Thuret, Payot, 1961.
 Novgorod First Chronicle

External links 
"Konchak", Internet Encyclopedia of Ukraine , vol. 2, 1989.

12th-century Kipchacks
History of Russia
History of Ukraine
Cumans